Beth Harrington (born July 2, 1955 in Boston, Massachusetts) is an Emmy-winning, Grammy-nominated filmmaker based in Vancouver, Washington, specializing in documentary features. Her documentaries often explore American history, music and culture, including the Carter Family and Johnny Cash, and the history of women in rockabilly. In addition to her film work as a producer, director and writer, Harrington is also a singer and guitarist, and was a member of Jonathan Richman and the Modern Lovers from 1980 to 1983.

Personal life 
The daughter of an art teacher and an artist/advertising executive of Irish and Italian heritage, Harrington was born and grew up in greater Boston. She attended Catholic elementary and high school in suburban Boston, a subject she revisited in her film The Blinking Madonna and Other Miracles. She holds a bachelor's degree in Public Communications from Syracuse University and a master's degree in American Studies from the University of Massachusetts.

Harrington's husband, Andy Lockhart, is a volcanologist for the U.S Geological Survey who she met while filming the Nova program In the Path of A Killer Volcano.

Career

Music
After volunteering at the pioneering progressive-rock radio station WBCN, she became involved in the Boston music scene as a member of such bands as the Awful Truth and Barry Marshall and the Rockin' Robins. She also did recording work with Willie "Loco" Alexander, Lenny Kaye, Andy Paley and Erik Lindgren, and sang on the soundtrack of the 1989 film Shag. She joined Jonathan Richman and the Modern Lovers in 1980, touring extensively with that group and singing on its 1983 album Jonathan Sings! She also played with Northwest-based band Spiricles from 2011 to 2017.

Film
Harrington's documentaries have been released theatrically, on streaming and on-demand platforms, and broadcast on public television, both as free-standing features and as episodes of such series as Nova and Frontline. They have been shown at such film festivals as SXSW, the Mill Valley Film Festival, the Hot Springs Documentary Film Festival, the Cleveland International Film Festival and the Nashville Film Festival.

In 1991, Harrington began a long association with Boston's flagship PBS station WGBH, where she worked as associate producer and line producer on various nationally broadcast documentaries, including episodes of Nova, Frontline and The AIDS Quarterly (later called Health Quarterly). She was a line producer for the Peabody Award-winning show Dating in the Age of AIDS, an episode of Health Quarterly, and associate producer for two national Emmy-nominated productions, In the Path of A Killer Volcano, a Nova episode, and the PBS special Apollo 13: To the Edge and Back.

After relocating to the Pacific Northwest in October 1996, Harrington became a frequent contributor to Oregon Public Broadcasting, working as a freelance filmmaker as well as doing development work on other projects for that station. Harrington's work for OPB includes producing episodes of the PBS series History Detectives and several specials, including Digital Television: A Cringely Crash Course, one of PBS's first High Definition productions. She has also been a producer/director and/or writer on several distance-learning programs for Annenberg Learning, including the photography series Essential Lens and the history series Bridging World History.

Harrington also won acclaim for her 1996 feature The Blinking Madonna and Other Miracles, a "creative nonfiction" film telling the story of a miracle Harrington may have witnessed through a combination of documentary footage and scripted scenes performed by actors and real-life participants. It aired on national public television and screened at numerous film festivals.

Harrington's 2001 independent production Welcome to the Club: The Women of Rockabilly, a documentary about the pioneering women of early rock 'n' roll, was broadcast nationally on public television stations, and was nominated for a Grammy in the category of Best Long Form Video.

In 2008, Harrington produced, directed and wrote Searching for York, which told the little-known history of an enslaved man who served as a valued member of the Lewis and Clark Expedition. Her 2009 production Kam Wah Chung told the tale of two Chinese men living in Eastern Oregon during the Gold Rush. These programs each received two Northwest Emmy nominations, in the categories of Best Historical/Cultural Program and Best Writing.

Two other programs produced, directed and written by Harrington—ZigZag: Real Stories, New Angles, an innovative 2004 environmental public affairs show and Beervana, a 2007 look at Oregon's beer culture and history, also received Northwest Emmy nominations, for Best Public Affairs Special and Best Historical/Cultural Program, respectively.

Harrington's documentary The Winding Stream: The Carters, the Cashes and the Course of Country Music tells the story of country music's influential Carter family, and includes one of Johnny Cash's last interviews. The Winding Stream premiered at 2014's SXSW Film Festival, and went on to appear at over 30 other festivals. It was released in theaters across North America, and later had its digital and DVD launch on Netflix, Amazon, iTunes, Vudu and other platforms, and was well-reviewed in a number of national publications, including Variety, Rolling Stone, and The Hollywood Reporter. Harrington was also co-producer of The Winding Stream'''s soundtrack album, released by Omnivore Recordings. In 2021, the New York Daily News named The Winding Stream No. 56 on a list of the 100 best documentaries of all time.

In 2019, Harrington's film Fort Vancouver, the story of the Hudson's Bay Company in the Pacific Northwest, won a Northwest Regional Emmy as Best Historical/Cultural Program. Her 2020 film Once Upon a Time in the Northwest: The Music of Federale also won a Northwest Emmy.

Harrington is currently developing several new projects, including developing her music-based scripted short The Musicianer, starring actress Grey DeLisle and Canadian musician Petunia, into a feature film. Another project, Beyond the Duplex Planet, is a feature-length documentary about artist David Greenberger and his work turning interviews with senior citizens into art. A third, Foremothers, features present-day portraits of trailblazing women of rock 'n' roll. Yet another, Our Mr. Matsura'', is a historical non-fiction film about a Japanese photographer's unconventional work documenting the people of Washington state in the early 1900s. The project received development funding in April 2021 from the National Endowment for the Humanities.

Other work
Harrington is active in various film and arts organizations, having served on the board of the Hollywood Theatre in Portland, Oregon, as well as the Oregon Media Production Association. She is currently a commissioner on the Vancouver, Washington, Culture, Arts and Heritage Commission.

Harrington is also a past president of Women in Film/New England and a former vice president of Women in Film/Seattle. She is a voting member of the National Academy of Recording Arts and Sciences. She has been a media instructor at Washington State University, Lewis & Clark College, Bunker Hill Community College, New England School of Photography, Boston Film/Video Foundation, the Northwest Film Center and the Olympia Film Society, as well as an artist-in-residence at the Vancouver School of Arts and Academics.

Awards and nominations
Harrington's films have won and been nominated for multiple awards; a complete list can be found in the filmography section below. In addition to her individual films, Harrington has also been honored with the following awards for her overall career:
I Migliori Award, Pirandello Lyceum, Dante Aligheri Society, Boston, 1986
Artist Trust/Washington State Arts Commission Fellowship, 2001
Artist Fellow, Playa Art and Science Residency Program, 2018
Clark County Arts Commission Lifetime Achievement Award, 2019

Filmography

References

External links
 Beth Harrington official site
 
 

1955 births
American producers
American directors
Syracuse University alumni
University of Massachusetts Boston alumni
American rock guitarists
American rock singers
Singers from Massachusetts
The Modern Lovers members
Artists from Boston
Musicians from Boston
People from Vancouver, Washington
Living people
Regional Emmy Award winners